Then I'll Come Back to You is a 1916 American silent drama film directed by George Irving and starring Alice Brady, Jack Sherrill and Eric Blind. It is based on the novel of the same title by Larry Evans.

Cast
 Alice Brady as Barbara Allison
 Jack Sherrill as Steve O'Mara
 Eric Blind as Caleb Hunter
 Leo Gordon as Archie Wickersham
 George Kline as Harrigan
 Marie Wells as Miriam
 Ted Dean as Little Steve

References

Bibliography
 Goble, Alan. The Complete Index to Literary Sources in Film. Walter de Gruyter, 1999.

External links
 

1916 films
1916 drama films
1910s English-language films
American silent feature films
Silent American drama films
American black-and-white films
Films directed by George Irving
World Film Company films
1910s American films
English-language drama films